Regulated rewriting is a specific area of formal languages studying grammatical systems which are able to take some kind of control over the production applied in a derivation  step. For this reason, the grammatical systems studied in Regulated Rewriting theory are  also called "Grammars with Controlled Derivations". Among such grammars can be noticed:

Matrix Grammars

Basic concepts
Definition
A Matrix Grammar, is a four-tuple  where
1.-  is an alphabet of non-terminal symbols
2.-  is an alphabet of terminal symbols disjoint with 
3.-  is a finite set of matrices, which are non-empty sequences  
, 
, where each 
, is an ordered pair

being

these pairs are called "productions", and are denoted
. In these conditions the matrices can be written down as

4.- S is the start symbol

Definition
Let  be a matrix grammar and let 
or "linear" or "without -productions" if and only if the grammar  has the corresponding property.

The classic example 
Note: taken from Abraham 1965, with change of nonterminals names
The context-sensitive language 

is generated by the 
 where
 is the non-terminal set, 
 is the terminal set,
and the set of matrices is defined as

,
,
,
.

Time Variant Grammars
Basic concepts 
Definition
A Time Variant Grammar is a pair  where   
numbers to the class of subsets of the set of productions.

Programmed Grammars 
Basic concepts

Definition
A Programmed Grammar is a pair  where   
to the class of subsets of the set of productions.

Grammars with regular control language

Basic concepts
Definition
A Grammar With Regular Control Language, 
, is a pair  where   

A naive example
Consider the CFG
 where
 is the non-terminal set, 
 is the terminal set,
and the productions set is defined as

being 

,
,

,
, and
.
Clearly,
. 
Now, considering the productions set 
 as an alphabet (since it is a finite set),
define the regular expression over :
.

Combining the CFG grammar  and the regular expression
, we obtain the CFGWRCL 

which generates the language
.

Besides there are other grammars with regulated rewriting, the four cited above are good examples of how to extend context-free grammars with some kind of control mechanism to obtain a Turing machine powerful grammatical device.

References 

Salomaa, Arto (1973) Formal languages. Academic Press, ACM monograph series

Rozenberg, G.; Salomaa, A. (eds.) 1997, Handbook of formal languages. Berlin; New York : Springer  (set)  (3540604200 : v. 1; 3540606483 : v. 2; 3540606491: v. 3)

Dassow, Jürgen;  Paun, G. 1990, Regulated Rewriting in Formal Language Theory . Springer-Verlag New York, Inc.  Secaucus, New Jersey, USA , Pages: 308. Medium: Hardcover.

Dassow, Jürgen, Grammars with Regulated Rewriting. Lecture in the 5th PhD Program "Formal Languages and Applications", Tarragona, Spain, 2006.

Abraham, S. 1965. Some questions of language theory, Proceedings of the 1965 International Conference On Computational Linguistics, pp. 1–11, Bonn, Germany, 

Formal languages
Formal methods